The Pointe de Bellecombe is a 2,775 m high mountain of the northern Cottian Alps.

Geography 

The mountain is located in the French departement of Savoie (Auvergne-Rhône-Alpes), near the Italian border. It belongs to the main chain of the Alps and stands on the water divide between the watersheds of the Dora Riparia (Po Valley) and of the Arc (Rhone Valley). It lyes between the Col du Petit Mont-Cenis (2,183 m) and the Col de Bellecombe (2,475 m).

History 
The mountain, although lying on the Alpine watershed between the Val di Susa and the Maurienne, is entirely in French territory following the boundary adjustments decided in the 1947 Treaty of Paris. The area was interested by the Vallo Alpino and ligne Maginot fortifications and then during the II World War saw the fights facing the chasseurs alpins (French Army) and the German mountain troops.

Access to the summit 
The summit can be reached on foot starting from the refuge du Petit Mont Cenis (at 2,095 m).  The itinerary doesn't require alpinistic skills but some hiking experience.

Maps
 French  official cartography (Institut géographique national - IGN); on-line version: www.geoportail.fr
 Istituto Geografico Centrale - Carta dei sentieri e dei rifugi 1:50.000 nr 2 Valli di Lanzo e Moncenisio

References

External links 

 

Mountains of the Alps
Two-thousanders of France
Mountains of Savoie